The Hugo Award for Best Professional Magazine was one of the Hugo Awards given each year for professionally edited magazines related to science fiction or fantasy and which had published four or more issues with at least one issue appearing in the previous calendar year. The Hugo Awards have been described as "a fine showcase for speculative fiction" and "the best known literary award for science fiction writing".

The award was first presented in 1953, the first year any Hugo Award was given, and with the exception of 1954 was given annually through 1972 when it was retired in favor of the newly created professional editor category. For the 1957 awards, the category was split into American and British magazine categories, a distinction which was not repeated any other year. In addition to the regular Hugo awards, beginning in 1996 Retrospective Hugo Awards, or "Retro Hugos", have been available to be awarded for years 50, 75, or 100 years prior in which no awards were given. To date, Retro Hugo awards have been awarded for 1946, 1951, and 1954, but only for the professional editor category, not the professional magazine category that would have existed at the time.

During the nineteen nomination years, twelve magazines run by fifteen editors were nominated. Of these, only five magazines run by eight editors won. Astounding Science-Fiction/Analog Science Fact & Fiction and The Magazine of Fantasy & Science Fiction each won eight times, out of eighteen and fifteen nominations, respectively. If won three of five nominations, New Worlds won one of its six nominations—though its win was in the 1957 "British Professional Magazine" category—and Galaxy Science Fiction won only one out of its fifteen nominations, for the first award in 1953. Of the magazines which never won, Amazing Stories was nominated the most at eight times, while the only other magazine to be nominated more than twice was Science Fantasy with three nominations. John W. Campbell, Jr. received both the most nominations and awards, as he edited Analog Science Fact & Fiction for all eighteen nominations and eight wins. Edward L. Ferman and Robert P. Mills both won four times, while Frederik Pohl won three. H. L. Gold received the second most nominations at twelve, while Cele Goldsmith received the most nominations without winning at ten for her work on two separate magazines; she was the only female editor to be nominated.

Selection
Hugo Award nominees and winners are chosen by supporting or attending members of the annual World Science Fiction Convention (Worldcon) and the presentation evening constitutes its central event. The selection process is defined in the World Science Fiction Society Constitution as instant-runoff voting with five nominees, except in the case of a tie. These five works on the ballot are the five most-nominated by members that year, with no limit on the number of works that can be nominated. The 1953 through 1956 and 1958 awards did not include any recognition of runner-up magazines, but since 1959 all five candidates were recorded. Initial nominations are made by members in January through March, while voting on the ballot of five nominations is performed roughly in April through July, subject to change depending on when that year's Worldcon is held. Worldcons are generally held near the start of September, and are held in a different city around the world each year.

Winners and nominees 
In the following table, the years correspond to the date of the ceremony, rather than when the work was first published. Each date links to the "year in literature" article corresponding with when the work was eligible. Entries with a blue background and an asterisk (*) next to the work's name have won the award; those with a white background are the nominees on the short-list. For 1957, when the awards were split into a "Best Professional American Magazine" and "Best Professional British Magazine", the year column is marked as to which category the works were entered in. Note that Astounding Science-Fiction and Analog Science Fact & Fiction are the same magazine; no other nominated magazine underwent a name change during the period the award was active.

  *   Winners and joint winners

References

External links
Hugo Awards official site

Professional Magazine
Literary awards for magazines